Michael J. Garanzini, S.J. (born September 24, 1948 in Saint Louis, Missouri) is an American priest of the Society of Jesus religious order of the Roman Catholic Church in the United States. He currently serves as President of both the International Association of Jesuit Universities and the US-based Association of Jesuit Colleges and Universities. From 2001 until 2015, Garanzini served as the twenty-third President of Loyola University Chicago in Chicago, Illinois, a member of the twenty-seven institution Association of Jesuit Colleges and Universities.

Biography
Garanzini graduated from Saint Louis University with a Bachelor of Arts in Psychology in 1971, the same year that he entered the Society of Jesus. After spending years around the country and in Rome during his training and early years as a Jesuit, Garanzini received a doctorate in psychology and religion in 1986 from the University of California, Berkeley. Later that year, he returned to Saint Louis University, teaching as an associate professor of psychology and later serving as academic vice president. Garanzini was invited to Fordham University to serve as a visiting professor of counseling in 1998, and went on to work at Georgetown University until his presidency at Loyola. He has also taught at the Pontifical Gregorian University in Rome and at Regis College (now Regis University) in Denver.

Garanzini is the author of The Attachment Cycle: An Object Relations Approach to the Healing Ministries (1988), Meeting the Needs of Dysfunctional Families (1993), Child-Centered Schools: An Educator's Guide to Family Dysfunction (1995), and articles in numerous journals.

Garanzini is member of the Fairfield University Board of Trustees.

On July 1, 2015 Garanzini accepted appointment to the Chicago Board of Education.

Loyola University Chicago
During Garanzini's tenure as president of Loyola University Chicago, he has brought the University out of debt in a few years. He has also initiated construction projects on both of Loyola's city campuses. The building work has benefitted from donations of alumni and others.

In 2015, Garanzini announced his intention to step down after fourteen years of leading Loyola. He will remain as chancellor, an advisory role to the president focused on matters of mission and institutional advancement.

Awards
Garanzini was inducted as a laureate of The Lincoln Academy of Illinois and awarded the Order of Lincoln (the state's highest honor) by the governor of Illinois in 2018.

References

External links
 Loyola University Chicago President's Biography

1948 births
Living people
American people of Italian descent
20th-century American Jesuits
21st-century American Jesuits
Loyola University Chicago faculty
Saint Louis University alumni
University of California, Berkeley alumni
Saint Louis University faculty
Regis University faculty
Fordham University faculty
Georgetown University faculty
Members of the Chicago Board of Education
Presidents of Loyola University Chicago